NGC 1001 is an unbarred spiral galaxy in the constellation Perseus. It was discovered on December 8, 1871 by the astronomer Édouard Stephan.

References 

Perseus (constellation)
1001
Unbarred spiral galaxies
010050